Pascal Stöger (born 7 July 1990) is an Austrian professional footballer who plays as a midfielder for Union Dietach. He is the brother of Kevin Stöger.

External links

1990 births
Living people
Austrian footballers
Association football defenders
SV Ried players